Tillandsia bermejoensis is a species in the genus Tillandsia. This species is endemic to Bolivia.

References

bermejoensis
Flora of Bolivia